Nemesis Online is an album by the Legendary Pink Dots, released in 1998.

Critical reception
The Washington Post wrote: "Using today's technology to evoke the spirit of 1972, the Legendary Pink Dots make a credible case for self-indulgent art-rock." Keyboard thought that "as talented as the band is at manipulating tonal moods through programming, sampling, and effects, they can just as easily evoke feelings of terror or tranquillity with only a piano or guitar and vocals." The Chicago Tribune called the album "a tad uneven," but wrote that "it still erupts with some typically pretty, woozy and eerie hallucinations."

Track listing 
 "Dissonance" - 5:46
 "Jasz" - 1:25
 "As Long As It's Purple And Green" - 6:04
 "Ghost" - 3:46
 "Under Your Wheels" - 4:09
 "A Sunset For A Swan" - 5:43
 "Is It Something I Said?" - 5:11
 "Zoo" - 5:35
 "Fate's Faithful Punchline" - 5:43
 "Cheating The Shadow" - 3:29
 "Abracadabra" - 5:54
 "Slaapliedje" - 5:32

There has been a limited edition vinyl release too, encompassing two bonus songs on the D side.

"10th Shade" - 12:16
"Schatten" - 5:10

Credits
The Prophet Qa'Sepel - keyboards, voice, loops, destroyed lyre
The Silverman (Phil Knight) - keyboards, loops, devices
Niels van Hoornblower - horns, flutes
Ryan Moore - bass, drums, guitar
Edwin von Trippenhof - guitar and guitar mutations
Frank Verschuuren - sound devices

References

1998 albums
The Legendary Pink Dots albums